The Hambling Baronetcy, of Yoxford in the County of Suffolk, is a title in the Baronetage of the United Kingdom. It was created on 27 February 1924 for Sir Herbert Hambling, Kt., Deputy Chairman of Barclays Bank and a Financial Member of the Ministry of Munitions from 1914 to 1919.

Hambling baronets, of Yoxford (1924)
Sir (Henry) Herbert Hambling, 1st Baronet (1857–1932)
Sir (Herbert) Guy Musgrave Hambling, 2nd Baronet (1883–1966)
Sir (Herbert) Hugh Hambling, 3rd Baronet (3 August 1919 – 6 May 2010 )
Sir (Herbert) Peter Hugh Hambling, 4th Baronet (born 6 September 1953 )

Arms

References
Kidd, Charles, Williamson, David (editors). Debrett's Peerage and Baronetage (1990 edition). New York: St Martin's Press, 1990.

Hambling